Castleton University is a public university in Castleton, Vermont. It has an enrollment of 2000 students and offers more than 30 undergraduate programs, as well as master's degrees in education and accounting. It is accredited by the New England Commission of Higher Education.

History

Castleton University traces its history to the Rutland County Grammar School, chartered by the Vermont General Assembly on October 15, 1787. The Grammar School was a regional school, preparing young men for college through instruction in traditional academic subjects such as Latin and Greek. The institution frequently changed its name during the 19th century. At various times it was known as Castleton Academy, Castleton Academy and Female Seminary, Vermont Classical High School, and Castleton Seminary.

In 1823, instruction in "the solid branches of female education" began for "young Ladies and Misses". By the time of the Civil War, the majority of the students attending Castleton were young women.

In 1829, a three-story brick building costing US$30,000 was constructed on a small hill south of the village. Principal Solomon Foot (1826–1829), who would go on to be President pro tempore of the U.S. Senate during the Civil War, was the driving force in this expansion of the school. The Seminary Building (eventually known as the Old Seminary Building) was the most impressive structure in the village, but expensive to maintain and often too large for the school's struggling enrollment.

Castleton Medical College (1818–1862) was also located in the village. It graduated 1400 students, more than any other medical school in New England at the time. Although Castleton Medical College and Castleton Seminary were separate institutions, they often shared faculty. Today the former medical college building, known as the Old Chapel, is the oldest building on the campus.

The first female principal was Harriet Newell Haskell (1862–1867). She had attended the Seminary as a child, took classes at Middlebury College without being permitted to matriculate, and then attended Mount Holyoke Female Seminary, which was not yet a college but offered a college-level curriculum for women. Although Haskell was in her 20s when she served as principal, the school flourished under her administration. With her departure to be principal of Monticello Ladies Seminary in Godfrey, Illinois, Castleton Seminary went into decline.

The school began its transition to a college in 1867, when the State Normal School at Castleton was founded as one of three state normal schools chartered by Vermont.

Normal schools educated students for teaching careers. For 30 years the Normal School property and grounds were privately owned by Abel E. Leavenworth and his son Philip. In 1912, the State of Vermont purchased the property.

In the 1920s and 1930s, under the direction of Caroline S. Woodruff, the college experienced dramatic growth in students and its stature. Woodruff modernized the school's curriculum, incorporating the theories of Vermont educator-philosopher John Dewey, especially his precepts of "learning by doing" and "learning by teaching". She hired staff with advanced degrees, and broadened her students' exposure to the world by bringing people such as Helen Keller, Robert Frost, and Norman Rockwell to Castleton. Woodruff was the first and only Vermonter to become president of the National Education Association.

In 1947, the Normal School became Castleton Teachers College. With increased enrollment from men, intercollegiate athletics began in the 1950s.

In 1962, the institution became Castleton State College when it joined other state-supported colleges in becoming a part of the Vermont State Colleges, a consortium of colleges governed by a common board of trustees, chancellor, and Council of Presidents, each college having its own president and deans.

In 1979, the Board of Trustees proposed a name change to Southern Vermont State College; the proposal was never acted on. On July 23, 2015, the Vermont State Colleges Board of Trustees voted unanimously to change the name of the institution to Castleton University.

Nearby Rutland plays host to the Castleton Polling Institute, as well as a professional development center for educators and entrepreneurs. In September 2016, the university opened Foley Hall, a two-floor residence, in collaboration with Green Mountain Power and Efficiency Vermont that provides housing for students. Castleton extended its reach into Bennington County in 2019, when it began a partnership with Southwestern Vermont Medical Center in Bennington to host its B.S. registered nurse program after the closure of Southern Vermont College that year. Castleton collaborates with Vermont Technical College in the nursing program, whose offices are housed in the Bjur Building (otherwise known as the Vermont Mill).

On July 1, 2023, Castleton University will merge with fellow Vermont State Colleges System institutions (Northern Vermont University and Vermont Technical College) to create Vermont State University.

Castleton Polling Institute
In 2012, Castleton began the Castleton Polling Institute with an initial investment of $100,000. The first poll was conducted from February 11 to February 22, 2012, and polled Vermont voters about the 2012 Presidential Primaries. Since the first poll, the Polling Institute has conducted over 30 public opinion and public policy polls for state agencies, non-profits, and media organizations. The institute's founding director, Rich Clark, is a professor of political science and had been working in academia and polling for 15 years before coming to Castleton in 2011 from the University of Georgia.

Athletics

The Castleton Spartans compete in 28 NCAA Division III varsity sports (14 men's 14 women's).

Notable alumni

Chad Bentz, baseball player
Arthur P. Carpenter, US Marshal for Vermont
William Carris, Vermont State Senator
Barbara Crampton, actress
Robby Kelley, Former U.S. Ski Team Member
Kevin J. Mullin, member of the Vermont House of Representatives and Vermont Senate
Hester Martha Poole (1833/34–1932), writer, artist, advocate
Scott La Rock, musician
Twiddle, jam band

See also
 List of colleges and universities in Vermont
 Lists of American universities and colleges

References

Further reading

External links
 
 Castleton Athletics website

 
1787 establishments in Vermont
Buildings and structures in Rutland County, Vermont
Castleton, Vermont
Education in Rutland County, Vermont
Educational institutions established in 1787
Liberal arts colleges in Vermont
New England Hockey Conference teams
Organizations based in Vermont
Public universities and colleges in Vermont
Tourist attractions in Rutland County, Vermont
Vermont State Colleges